22 may refer to:
 22 (number)
 22 BC
 AD 22
 1922
 2022

Music 
 22 (album), a 2003 album by Parva
 "22" (Lily Allen song), 2009
 "22" (Taylor Swift song), 2013
 "22" (Sarah McTernan song), 2019 song that represented Ireland in the Eurovision Song Contest 2019
 "22", a song by Gavin James from the album Bitter Pill, 2015
 22 (also known as "Marsha Hunt's 22"), an early 1970s British rock band fronted by Marsha Hunt
 "Twenty Two" (Millencolin song), 1997

 "Intentions (22)", a 2019 song by Ziggy Alberts

Other uses 
 "Twenty Two" (The Twilight Zone), a 1961 episode of The Twilight Zone
 Revista 22 or 22 Magazine, a Romanian weekly
 22, a fictional character in the 2020 animated film Soul
 22 caliber, a family of firearms and firearm cartridges

See also
 22, A Million, a 2016 album by Bon Iver
 Twenty Plus Two, a 1961 American film noir
 List of highways numbered 22